The Newman Prize for Chinese Literature was established in 2008 by Peter Gries, director of the Institute for U.S.-China Issues at the University of Oklahoma. The first major American award for Chinese literature, the Newman Prize, is awarded every two years. It is granted solely based on literary merit, and any living author writing in Chinese is eligible for a recommendation. The Prize honors Harold J. and Ruth Newman, whose generosity enabled the establishment of the OU Institute for US-China Issues.

Nominations and ceremony
Nominations for candidates and the selection of the winner are both handled by an international jury of distinguished experts, based on a transparent voting process. The winner is awarded  $10,000 and a plaque and is invited to the University of Oklahoma to participate in an award ceremony and academic activities.

Winners and nominees

See also
The University of Oklahoma is regarded as one of the foremost centers for studying world literature. It is home to the journals World Literature Today and Chinese Literature Today, and also awards the biennial Neustadt International Prize for Literature.

References

American literary awards
Awards established in 2008
2008 establishments in the United States
Chinese-language literary awards